McMinnville High School is a public high school located in McMinnville, Oregon, United States.

History
Prior to 1876, high school students in the McMinnville area attended school at McMinnville College. From 1876 to 1910, McMinnville offered a two-year high school education through the Cook School (a single schoolhouse incorporating all grades). High school students took courses on the top floor of the building. The current four-year high school program was adopted in fall 1910 with the opening of McMinnville High School. It is to this school that the current McMinnville High School traces its lineage.

The oldest wing of the current high school opened in 1956, and has since been remodeled eleven times to accommodate the growing student population of McMinnville, Oregon.The latest renovation was completed Fall 2019.

Hayden and Abby Catt attended the school, and participated on the swim team, before moving to Texas, where they stood trial for robbing banks there.

Academics
In 2008, 75% of the school's seniors received their high school diploma. Of 459 students, 343 graduated, 60 dropped out, 3 received a modified diploma, and 53 are still in high school.

Engineering and Aerospace Sciences Academy (EASA)
Engineering and Aerospace Sciences Academy (EASA) is a specialized program at McMinnville High School that offers students specialized courses in engineering and aerospace science. Students are instructed by engineers and technicians who lecture, serve as resources for student research, and work with students on a variety of real and simulated technical problems and projects.

Athletics

State championships
 COED Cheerleading: 2017
 Boys' swimming: 1997, 1998, 2002
 Girls' swimming: 1957, 2003, 2004
 Girls' track and field: 1996
 Boys' soccer: 2006
 Boys basketball: 1979 (led by future NBA player Charlie Sitton)
 Girls' tennis: 1955, 1956, 1957

Notable alumni
Verne Duncan,  American politician
Bill Krueger, former Major League Baseball pitcher
Ehren McGhehey, daredevil, actor, Jackass star
Grant Robison, Olympic track athlete
Joe Paterson, former Major League Baseball pitcher
Raemer Schreiber, American physicist 
Charlie Sitton, American retired basketball player

References

Buildings and structures in McMinnville, Oregon
High schools in Yamhill County, Oregon
Public high schools in Oregon
1910 establishments in Oregon